Return to the Truth (Spanish: Retorno a la verdad) is a 1956 Spanish drama film directed by Antonio del Amo and starring Susana Canales, Julio Peña and Germán Cobos.

Plot

Cast
 Susana Canales 
 Julio Peña 
Germán Cobos 
 Ángel Ter 
 Dolores Quesada 
 María Luisa Moneró 
 Rafael Calvo Revilla
 María Sánchez Aroca 
 Rodolfo del Campo 
 Amalia Sánchez Ariño 
 Marisa Ramos
 Fermín Sánchez
 Lída Baarová

References

Bibliography 
 de España, Rafael. Directory of Spanish and Portuguese film-makers and films. Greenwood Press, 1994.

External links 
 

1956 drama films
Spanish drama films
1956 films
1950s Spanish-language films
Films directed by Antonio del Amo
Films scored by Jesús García Leoz
1950s Spanish films
Spanish black-and-white films